The grey-crested cacholote (Pseudoseisura unirufa) is a species of bird in the family Furnariidae. It is sometimes known as the rufous cacholote, but this is potentially confusing, as this name also was used for the "combined" species when P. unirufa was considered a subspecies of P. cristata. It is mainly found in semi-open habitats in the Pantanal-region in Brazil, Paraguay and Bolivia, but also occurs in north-central Bolivia.

Description

The head, body, wings and tail are a uniform cinnamon-rufous colour, and the bushy crest, which can be raised expressively, is usually grey. The iris is yellow. It is a noisy bird, especially near its nest, one bird of a pair making a descending series of "chup" notes ending in an extended churring sound, and the other responding with a series of "che" sounds in a complex, raucous duet. This species could be confused with the Caatinga cacholote, but that species is a little paler, the bill is longer, and the crest lacks grey; besides this, the two species do not share a common range.

Behaviour
The nest is a bulky affair built of sticks in a tree. The birds often move about in pairs, foraging in trees, and sometimes descending to the ground to walk or hop about in a rather ungainly fashion.

Status
The grey-crested cacholote has a wide range in Bolivia, northern Paraguay and southwestern Brazil. It is common in at least part of its range and populations seem stable, so the International Union for Conservation of Nature has assessed its conservation status as being of least concern.

References

Further reading
 Zimmer, K., and Whittaker, A. (2000). The Rufous Cacholote (Furnariidae: Pseudoseisura) is two species. Condor. 102(2): 409–422

Pseudoseisura
Birds of Bolivia
Birds of the Pantanal
Birds of Paraguay
Birds described in 1838
Taxonomy articles created by Polbot